Dellach im Drautal is a town in the district of Spittal an der Drau in the Austrian state of Carinthia.

Geography
Dellach im Drautal lies in the Drau valley about halfway between Lienz and Spittal, between the Gailtal Alps on the south and the Kreuzeck group of the Hohe Tauern on the north.

Climate

References

Cities and towns in Spittal an der Drau District
Kreuzeck group
Gailtal Alps